William N. Rom is the Sol and Judith Bergstein Professor of Medicine and Environmental Medicine, Emeritus at New York University School of Medicine and former Director of the Division of Pulmonary, Critical Care and Sleep Medicine at New York University and Chief of the Chest Service at Bellevue Hospital Center, 1989–2014. He is Research Scientist at the School of Global Public Health at New York University and Adjunct Professor at the NYU Robert F. Wagner Graduate School of Public Service. He teaches Climate Change and Global Public Health and Environmental Health in a Global World.

Education and career
William N. Rom received a BA cum laude in Political Science from the University of Colorado (The West's Conservation Controversy 1901–1908), his BS, MD in Medicine from the University of Minnesota School of Medicine, and MPH in Environmental and Occupational Health from Harvard T.H. Chan School of Public Health in 1973. He did his residency in Internal Medicine at the University Of California, Davis and Sacramento Medical Center and fellowship with Drs. Irving J. Selikoff and Alvin Teirstein in Pulmonary and Occupational Medicine at Mt. Sinai in New York.

He worked as Assistant and Associate Professor at the Pulmonary and Critical Care Division at the University of Utah School of Medicine and was Founder/Director of the Rocky Mountain Center for Occupational and Environmental Health., He was an adjunct in Immunology at Rockefeller University, and taught Pulmonary Medicine at the University of Addis Ababa, and at Bishkek, Kyrgyzstan. He was a Senior Investigator at Pulmonary Branch, National Heart Lung and Blood Institute (NHLBI), NIH (1983–1989).
William N. Rom spoke at the Selke Hearings with Sigurd Olson in Ely, MN in 1964 against clear-cut logging, and chaired a Symposium on protecting the Boundary Waters Canoe Area at the University of Minnesota on inaugural Earth Day, April 22, 1970.  He was a wilderness canoe guide in the Boundary Waters Canoe Area Wilderness and Quetico Provincial Park and canoed the Albany, Churchill, South Nahanni, Back and Allagash Rivers.

Research

Environmental Lung Disease
William N. Rom began environmental lung disease research at Mt. Sinai studying asbestos-exposed workers and household contacts, and farmers exposed to polybrominated biphenyls.
Rom studied coal miners, dental laboratory workers, trona miners, oil shale workers, and copper smelter workers at the University of Utah.

At the NIH, Rom studied workers exposed to asbestos, silica, or coal to elucidate the mechanisms of fibrosis by measuring growth factors released by alveolar macrophages obtained by bronchoalveolar lavage. He identified and purified the macrophage insulin-like I molecule. He led an expedition to India to study the chronic effects of Tropical Pulmonary Eosinophilia.

Host Response to Tuberculosis and AIDS
While at NYU/Bellevue, Rom focused research on the translational molecular mechanisms of the host response to tuberculosis. With Dr. Neil Schluger, he built the first hospital-based directly observed therapy program funded by the Robert Wood Johnson Foundation. He pioneered nuclear acid amplification for the detection of tuberculosis in the sputum and blood. He introduced bronchoalveolar lavage in TB patients and developed the concept of comparing BAL in the involved to the uninvolved lung. He characterized the lymphocytes in TB inflammation. He showed that TB mycobacteria induced alveolar macrophages to secrete cytokines that directed transcription factors to stimulate high-level HIV replication  in TB-infected areas of the lung. In South Africa, he showed that aerosolized interferon-gamma could accelerate sputum clearance of TB mycobacteria from the sputum.

Lung Cancer
William N. Rom designed a lung-specific dominant negative p53 transgenic mouse that spontaneously developed adenocarcinoma of the lung over 9 months, and after intratracheal benzo(a)pyrene could synergize in causing lung cancer demonstrating gene-environment interaction. Rom founded and directed the NYU Lung Cancer Biomarker Center that was part of the NCI Early Detection Research Network (2001–2015). His findings in collaborative studies for early detection of lung cancer focused on networks of immune response, metabolism, growth factors and receptors, signaling pathways, cytokines, and altered methylation biomarkers.

World Trade Center Lung Disease
Rom described acute eosinophilic pneumonia in a New York City firefighter heavily exposed to World Trade Center (WTC) dust and illustrated WTC dust in BAL cells using scanning transmission electron microscopy.  He and colleagues described World Trade Center cough and breathlessness.  He described the use of oscillometry to decipher the silent zone of the small airways' inflammation due to WTC dust in the presence of normal spirometry yet persistent respiratory symptoms.  He served on the World Trade Center Health Program Scientific/Technical Advisory Committee of NIOSH.

Climate Change and Global Public Health
William N. Rom staffed Senator Hillary Rodham Clinton on the floor of the U.S. Senate October 2003 in the debate in favor of the McCain-Lieberman Cap-and-Trade bill.  He is co-editor with Kent Pinkerton PhD of Global Climate Change and Public Health Second Edition New York: Humana Press, 2021, (29 chapters). He has taught Climate Change and Environmental Health at NYU School of Global Public Health since 2015.

Awards and honors
Harriet Hardy Award for Excellence in Occupational Medicine by New England Occupational Medicine Association (1992)
NCI Early Detection Research Network Award for Providing Creative, Outstanding Leadership in Building a Strong, Effective Translational *Research Program on the Application of Biomarkers in Cancer Detection and Prevention (2007) (2009)
Robert Kehoe Award, American College of Occupational and Environmental Medicine (2012)
Murray Kornfeld Honor Lecture "Global TB/HIV and The Environment" American College of Chest Physicians (2013)
Distinguished Achievement Award, American Thoracic Society (2014)
He was elected to the Association of American Physicians in 1999 and was inducted as a Fellow by the American Association for the Advancement of Science in 2015.

William N. Rom received the Val Vallyathan Award from the American Thoracic Society Assembly on Environmental, Occupational, and Population Health in 2015. He received an Alumni Award of Merit from Harvard School of Public Health in 2011 and the Champion of Change Award from the White House in 2013 for his work on Climate Change.

The William N. Rom Environmental Lung Disease Laboratory at NYU/Bellevue Hospital for research on World Trade Center dust was named in his honor.  In addition, The William N. Rom and David Kamelhar Associate Professor of Medicine was named jointly in his honor.

Other activities
William N. Rom is a Fellow (1992) in The Explorer's Club, where he has been awarded four Flag expeditions: First, climbing Bob Marshall's mountain (Bob Marshall was a Founder of The Wilderness Society), Mt Doonerak, in the Brooks Range of Alaska. Second, the first Westerners to climb Mt. Geladaintong 21,730 feet, the source of the Yangtze River in the Kun Lun Range in northern Tibet. Third, crossings the island of South Georgia in the Antarctic along Sir Ernest Shackleton's route and Fourth, travelling with the Thule Inuit by dogsled in northern Greenland to obtain eyewitness accounts of the effects of global warming.

He was the founder and chair of the ATS Environmental Health Policy Committee and has testified numerous times to Congress, CASAC, and the EPA Administrator on PM2.5 and ozone.

Publications
Some selected publications are:

Rom WN, Travis WD and Brody AR.  Cellular and molecular basis of the asbestos-related diseases.  State of the Art. Am Rev Respir Dis. 1991; 143: 408-422.
Honda Y, Rogers L, Nakata K, Zhao B, Pine R, Nakai Y, Kurosu K, Rom WN, Weiden M.  Type I interferon induces inhibitory 16 kD CCAAT/Enhancer Binding Protein (C/EBP), repressing the HIV-1 long terminal repeat in macrophages: pulmonary tuberculosis alters C/EBP expression, enhancing HIV-1 replication.  J Exp Med. 1998; 188(7): 1-11. PMID: 9763605.
Rom WN, Pinkerton KE, Martin WJ, Forastiere F.  Global Warming: A challenge to all American Thoracic Society members.  Am J Respir Crit Care Med. 2008; 177(10): 1053-1054. Doi: 10.1164/rccm.200801-052ED. PMID: 18460457.
Ostroff RM, Bigbee WL, Franklin W, Gold L, Mehan M, Miller YE, Pass HI, Rom WN, Siegfried JM, Stewart A, Walker JJ, Weissfeld JL, Williams S, Zichi D, and Brody EN.  Unlocking biomarker discovery: Large scale application of aptamer proteomic technology for early detection of lung cancer.  PLoS One. 2010; 5: e15003.  doi: 10.137/journal/pone.0015003.PMID: 21170350.
Rom WN, Evans L, Uppal A. The sentinel event of climate change: Hurricane Sandy and its consequences for pulmonary and critical care medicine. Am J Respir Crit Care Med. 2013; 15(2); 187(2):iii-iv. doi: 10.1164/rccm.201212-2207OE. PMID: 23322801.
Ewart GW, Rom WN, Braman SS, Pinkerton KE.  From closing the atmospheric ozone hole to reducing climate change: Lessons learned.  Ann Am Thorac Soc. 2015; 12 (2): 247-251.  DOI: 10.1513/AnnalsATS.201411-537PS. PMID: 25706493.
Rom WN and Reibman J.  The History of the Bellevue Hospital Chest Service 1903-2015.  Ann Am Thorac Soc. 2015; 12(10): 1438-1446. COVER October 2015.  DOI: 10.1513/AnnalsATS.201506-370PS. PMID: 26406151.
Segal LN, Clemente JC, Koralov S, Tsay J-C, Koralov SB, Keller BC, Wu BG, Li Y, Shen N, Ghedin E, Morris A, Diaz P, Huang L, Wikoff WR, Ubeda C, Artacho A, Rom WN, Sterman DH, Collman RG, Blaser MJ, Weiden MD.  Enrichment of the lung microbiome with oral taxa is associated with lung inflammation of a Th17 phenotype.  Nature Microbiol. 2016; 1: 1-11. DOI: 10.1038/NMICROBIOL.2016.31.
Rom William and Hartling Neil.  Rafting the Alsek.  North America’s wildest river. The Explorers Journal 2017; 95 (3) Fall: 34-43.
Weng  M-w, Lee H-W, Park S-H, Wang H-T, Hu Y, Rom W, Huang W, Lepor H, Wu X-R, Yang CS, Chen L-C, Tang M-s.  A new paradigm for tobacco smoke carcinogenesis: aldehydes are the predominant forces inducing DNA damage and inhibiting DNA repair.  Proceedings of the National Academy of Sciences USA 2018; 115 (27) doi/10/1073/pnas.1804869115.

Books

Lee JS, Rom WN (eds):  Legal and Ethical Dilemmas in Occupational Health.  Ann Arbor, MI:  Ann Arbor Science Publishers, Inc., 1982
Wagner W, Rom WN, Merchant J (eds):  Health Issues Related to Metal and Non-metallic Mining.  Ann Arbor, MI:  Ann Arbor Science Publishers. 1984
 (1st Edition 1983; 2nd Edition 1992; 3rd Edition 1998; 4th Edition 2007).)

Rom WN and Garay S.  (Editors).  Tuberculosis, Boston, MA:  Little, Brown and Co, 1996 (1st Edition; 2nd Edition 1994).

Pinkerton KE and Rom WN, Editors, Global Climate Change and Public Health, New York, NY: Springer-Humana Press, 2013 (1st Edition, 2nd Edition 2021).

References

Year of birth missing (living people)
New York University Grossman School of Medicine faculty
University of Utah School of Medicine faculty
University of Colorado Boulder alumni
University of Minnesota Medical School alumni
Harvard School of Public Health alumni
Living people